Mohra Rajgan is a village in Bhalakhar, Kallar Syedan tehsil, Rawalpindi District, Pakistan.
The population of Mohra Rajgan peoples belong to Gakhar tribe.

External links 
 http://chakwal.dc.lhc.gov.pk/?page_id=1335

Populated places in Rawalpindi District